Sefer Ali-Bey Shervashidze (also known by the Christian name of Giorgi Shervashidze) was a prince of the Principality of Abkhazia in 1810–21.  He was the youngest son of Kelesh Ahmed-Bey Shervashidze.  

After Kelesh Ahmed-bey was killed by his heir, Aslan-Bey (or, according to George Hewitt by Sefer-bey himself, together with Nino Dadiani and the Russian military administration), Sefer Ali-Bey was forced to hide out in neighboring Mingrelia under the protection of the Mingrelian princess regent Nino.  With the help of the Mingrelian nobility, Sefer Ali-Bey tried unsuccessfully, to usurp the throne of Abkhazia.  In 1809, Shervashidze asked the Tsarist Russian Empire to take Abkhazia under its protection, with the condition that Ali-Bey be established as the new ruler of the Principality. After decisive Russian victories during the Second Russo-Turkish War, the Russian forces were able to expel pro-Turkish Abkhazians as well as the remaining Turkish forces from the region. Tsar Alexander I established Sefer Ali-Bey Shervashidze as the new ruler of Abkhazia on 17 February 1810. He died in 1821 and was buried at the Lykhny Church.

References
 Georgian State (Soviet) Encyclopedia. 1983. Book 10. p. 689.

Year of birth missing
1821 deaths
Abkhazian former Muslims
Princes of Abkhazia
Converts to Eastern Orthodoxy from Islam
House of Shervashidze